Small nuclear ribonucleoprotein Sm D2 is a protein that in humans is encoded by the SNRPD2 gene. It belongs to the small nuclear ribonucleoprotein core protein family, and is required for pre-mRNA splicing and small nuclear ribonucleoprotein biogenesis. Alternative splicing occurs at this locus and two transcript variants encoding the same protein have been identified.

Interactions
Small nuclear ribonucleoprotein D2 has been shown to interact with DDX20, Small nuclear ribonucleoprotein D1, Small nuclear ribonucleoprotein polypeptide F, CDC5L and SMN1.

References

Further reading